Bogdan Mladenović (born 4 April 1996) is a Serbian professional footballer who plays as a winger for Kolubara.

Club career
A product of the Rad youth system, Mladenović was promoted to the first-team squad in the second part of the 2014–15 Serbian SuperLiga, making 11 appearances and scoring one goal.

On 5 August 2019 it was confirmed, that Mladenović had joined Portuguese Primeira Liga club Gil Vicente.

On 22 January 2020 Mladenović signed for Serbian SuperLiga club Vojvodina.

On 30 June 2021 Mladenović signed for another Serbian SuperLiga club Kolubara from Lazarevac.

International career 
Mladenović made his international debut for Serbia in a friendly against Qatar in September 2016.

Statistics

Honours
Vojvodina
Serbian Cup: 2019–20

References

External links
 
 Bogdan Mladenović at Srbijafudbal

Association football midfielders
1996 births
Living people
Footballers from Belgrade
Serbia international footballers
Serbia youth international footballers
Serbian footballers
Serbian SuperLiga players
FK Rad players
OFK Žarkovo players
Gil Vicente F.C. players
FK Vojvodina players
Al-Diwaniya FC players
FK Kolubara players
Serbian expatriate footballers
Serbian expatriate sportspeople in Portugal
Expatriate footballers in Portugal
Serbian expatriate sportspeople in Iraq
Expatriate footballers in Iraq